Bryce Thompson (born September 20, 1999) is an American football defensive back for the Seattle Sea Dragons of the XFL. He played college football at Tennessee.

Early years
Thompson attended and played high school football at Dutch Fork in Irmo, South Carolina.

College career
Thompson played at the University of Tennessee from 2018–2020 under head coach Jeremy Pruitt. Thompson started 10 of 12 games in his freshman season, finishing with the highest grade of any freshman cornerback in the nation, with three interceptions and seven pass break-ups. In his sophomore year, he finished with three interceptions, along with 32 tackles and a sack. As a junior he played 10 games, finishing with a career-high 36 tackles, two interceptions, a force fumble and a fumble recovery. In January 2021, Thompson announced he was foregoing his senior year to declare for the 2021 NFL Draft.

Professional career

New Orleans Saints
After going undrafted in the 2021 NFL Draft, Thompson signed for the New Orleans Saints as an undrafted free agent on May 2, 2021. He was waived by the Saints, with an injury designation on August 26, 2021, before being waived from injured reserve on September 3, 2021. Thompson re-signed to the Saints practice squad on October 5, 2021. He made his NFL debut in week 16 of the 2021 NFL season against the Miami Dolphins having been a gameday COVID-19 replacement activated from the practice squad. He signed a reserve/future contract with the Saints on January 12, 2022.

Thompson was waived/injured on August 10, 2022, and was placed on injured reserve the next day. He was waived off injured reserve on August 15, 2022. He was re-signed to the practice squad on October 5. He was promoted to the active roster on October 8. He was waived on November 1 and re-signed to the practice squad. He was promoted back to the active roster on November 19, then waived two days later.

References

External links

Tennessee Volunteers bio

1999 births
Living people
Players of American football from South Carolina
American football cornerbacks
American football safeties
Tennessee Volunteers football players
New Orleans Saints players
Seattle Sea Dragons players
People from Irmo, South Carolina